Maacher Jhol is an Indian language Bengali film produced by Sony Pictures Networks and Mojo Productions directed by Pratim D. Gupta, starring Ritwick Chakraborty, Paoli Dam and Mamata Shankar in the lead roles. It is the first Bengali food film that revolves around a Paris-based chef who comes back to Kolkata after 13 years to attend to his ailing mother.

Plot
Dev D (Devdatto) is a renowned chef who quit his job as an engineer in Kolkata and moved to France train at Le Cordon Bleu in Paris. In doing so, he left behind his wife Sreela and his parents. When his mother falls ill, he returns to Kolkata after 13, he must come to terms with his past.

Cast 
 Ritwick Chakraborty as Dev D aka Devdatto
 Mamata Shankar as Maa
 Paoli Dam as Sreela
 Arjun Chakrabarty as Palash
 Kaya Blocksage
 Sauraseni Maitra
 Sumanta Mukherjee

Production

Development 
Pratim D. Gupta revealed that the idea of the film came during his trip to Italy where he was surprised to find local restaurants serving the recipes of mothers and grandmothers.

He also said that it was his eagerness to work with Ritwick Chakraborty again after Shaheb Bibi Golaam resulted in conceiving a character for him - Chef Dev D.

Casting 
While Pratim and Ritwick have worked together in Shaheb Bibi Golaam, the film marks the first collaboration between the director and Paoli Dam.  Mamata Shankar, known to be choosy about her roles, agreed to do the film immediately after reading the script.

Filming 
Shooting for the film started from March 2017.

Music 
The music for Maacher Jhol is composed by Anupam Roy and the lyrics have been penned by Anupam himself. One of the songs has been written by Rabindranath Tagore with a French section written and sung by Anupam. The music rights have been acquired by Zee Music Company.

References

External links
 

Bengali-language Indian films
2010s Bengali-language films
2017 films
Films about fish
Sony Pictures films
Columbia Pictures films
Sony Pictures Networks India films